Sandra Gal (born 9 May 1985) is a German professional golfer who currently plays on the United States–based LPGA Tour.

Childhood, college and amateur career
Born in Düsseldorf, Germany, Gal began playing golf at age five during family vacations to golf resorts around Europe. At age 17 she joined the German National Team and at 18 won the German National Girls Championship.  She graduated from high school in 2004.

While still competing on the German National Team, Gal attended college in the United States at the University of Florida in Gainesville. She played for the Florida Gators women's golf team from 2005 to 2007 and won four events in NCAA competition, received First Team All-American honors in 2007, and was an NGCA Academic All-American from 2005 to 2008.

In 2007, she won the Ladies European Amateur, and later that fall, entered the LPGA Qualifying Tournament where she qualified for the LPGA Tour for 2008 and immediately turned pro.  Although by turning pro she could no longer participate in collegiate golf, she completed her degree requirements while playing full-time on the LPGA Tour and graduated with honors from Florida in August 2008 with a bachelor's degree in advertising.

Professional career
Gal tied for 14th in the 2007 LPGA Final Qualifying Tournament to earn full playing privileges on the LPGA in 2008; she turned professional immediately following the tournament.

In her fourth season on the LPGA Tour in 2011, Gal won her first event at the Kia Classic in late March. She finished the 72-hole event at 16-under-par, one stroke ahead of runner-up Jiyai Shin Previously her best finish had been fifth at the 2009 LPGA Corning Classic. Also in 2009, she recorded two career-low rounds of 64.

Gal was a member of the winning European Solheim Cup Team in 2011 and also played on the European Solheim Cup Team in 2015.

In 2016, Gal participated at the Summer Olympics in Rio de Janeiro, Brazil where she finished in the position of T25.

Coaching staff
Gal's swing coach is Mitchell Spearman and her fitness coach is the fitness trainer of the National Golf Team Germany, Christian Marysko. Beginning in September 2016, her new caddie is Oliver Brett.

Professional wins (1)

LPGA Tour (1)

Results in LPGA majors
Results not in chronological order before 2019.

^ The Evian Championship was added as a major in 2013

DNP = did not play
CUT = missed the half-way cut
NT = no tournament
T = tied

Summary

Most consecutive cuts made – 5 (2011 U.S. Open – 2012 U.S. Open)
Longest streak of top-10s – 1

LPGA Tour career summary

 official through 2022 season

World ranking
Position in Women's World Golf Rankings at the end of each calendar year.

Team appearances
Amateur
Espirito Santo Trophy (representing Germany): 2004, 2006
European Ladies' Team Championship (representing Germany): 2005, 2007

Professional
Solheim Cup (representing Europe): 2011 (winners), 2015

Solheim Cup record

Olympic games participation

See also

List of Florida Gators women's golfers on the LPGA Tour
List of University of Florida alumni

References

External links 

German female golfers
Florida Gators women's golfers
LPGA Tour golfers
Solheim Cup competitors for Europe
Olympic golfers of Germany
Golfers at the 2016 Summer Olympics
Sportspeople from Düsseldorf
1985 births
Living people
21st-century German women